Aleksandar Vrhovac (Cyrillic: Александар Bpхoвaц; born February 8, 1972) is a retired Bosnian professional football player.

Club career
During his career Aleksandar has played for many clubs in the second and third tiers in Central and Eastern Europe, FK Borac Banja Luka and FK Kozara in Bosnia, Spartak Subotica and Radnički Bajmok in Serbia, Csepel SC and Videoton FC in Hungary, BŠK Bardejov in Slovakia, FC Krylia Sovetov Samara in Russia and Wolfsberger AC in Austria.

Having started playing as an attacking midfielder, or even sometimes striker, with time he started playing more as defensive midfielder, becoming one of the best players on that position in Bosnian league by the end of his career.

External sources
 Interview and career story at Borac B.Luka official website. 

1972 births
Living people
Sportspeople from Banja Luka
Serbs of Bosnia and Herzegovina
Association football midfielders
Yugoslav footballers
Bosnia and Herzegovina footballers
FK Borac Banja Luka players
FK Spartak Subotica players
Csepel SC footballers
Partizán Bardejov players
PFC Krylia Sovetov Samara players
FK Kozara Gradiška players
Wolfsberger AC players
Second League of Serbia and Montenegro players
Nemzeti Bajnokság III players
2. Liga (Slovakia) players
Russian Premier League players
Austrian Regionalliga players
Premier League of Bosnia and Herzegovina players
Bosnia and Herzegovina expatriate footballers
Expatriate footballers in Serbia and Montenegro
Bosnia and Herzegovina expatriate sportspeople in Serbia and Montenegro
Expatriate footballers in Hungary
Bosnia and Herzegovina expatriate sportspeople in Hungary
Expatriate footballers in Slovakia
Bosnia and Herzegovina expatriate sportspeople in Slovakia
Expatriate footballers in Russia
Bosnia and Herzegovina expatriate sportspeople in Russia
Expatriate footballers in Austria
Bosnia and Herzegovina expatriate sportspeople in Austria